Viola bertolonii is a species of violet known by the common name Bertoloni's pansy, belonging to the Violaceae family.

Etymology
The genus name, derived from the Latin word “viere” meaning “to tie”, possibly refers to the flexuosity of these plants. The species epithet honors the Italian botanist Antonio Bertoloni (1775–1869).

Description
 The biological form of Viola bertolonii is hemicryptophyte scapose, as its overwintering buds are situated just below the soil surface and the floral axis is more or less erect with a few leaves. It has a particularly low chromosome number (2n = 20) and possibly dates back to the late Tertiary.

The basal leaves are small, from round to oval, with an elongated petiole, while the upper leaves are linear and narrow, with pinnate stipules. The flowering period extends from April through June.

Distribution
It is an endemic with a quite restricted distribution range.

Habitat
The species is strictly associated with ultramafic serpentine substrates.

Subspecies
 Viola bertolonii subsp. bertolonii
 Viola bertolonii subsp. messanensis

Gallery

References

 Acta Plantarum

External links
 Schede di Botanica

bertolonii